Bolma flava is a species of sea snail, a marine gastropod mollusk in the family Turbinidae, the turban snails.

Distribution
This species occurs in the Indian Ocean off Madagascar.

References

External links
 To World Register of Marine Species

flava
Gastropods described in 1979